Ravipadu may refer to:

Andhra Pradesh, India 
 Ravipadu, Narasaraopet mandal, a village in the Narasaraopet mandal, Guntur district, Andhra Pradesh, India
 Ravipadu, Pedanandipadu mandal, a village in the Pedanandipadu mandal, Guntur District, Andhra Pradesh, India

Telangana, India 
 Ravipadu, Bibinagar mandal, a village in the Bibinagar mandal, Nalgonda district, Telangana, India